Thomas Brdarić (born 23 January 1975) is a German former professional footballer who played as a forward. He is the current head coach of Indian Super League club Chennaiyin.

Club career
Brdarić was born in Nürtingen, Baden-Württemberg, Germany. began his professional career with VfB Stuttgart, making his Bundesliga debut as a substitute for Fritz Walter on 29 August 1993 against Bayern Munich. In only his second game, against SG Wattenscheid 09, he scored his first goal in a 4–2 victory. He managed ten games in total in his debut season, but did not manage to keep his place in the squad as he was sold onto Fortuna Düsseldorf in the 2. Bundesliga.

He spent two seasons at the Rheinland club, helping them gain promotion to the top flight and maintaining their position. However, he managed just a solitary goal in his time and was again let go, back to the 2. Bundesliga with rivals Fortuna Köln. His spell here was much more successful as he became a first-team regular and found his finishing touch, particularly in 1998–99 when he managed 13 goals in 29 appearances.

This form caught the eye of Bundesliga club Bayer 04 Leverkusen and they snapped him up in summer 1999. Although he never scored regularly in his time there, he mostly managed to hold down a first team place and enjoyed playing on the biggest stage of his career. During his time with the club, he twice finished second in the league and appeared in the 2002 DFB Cup final, and most prestigiously, the UEFA Champions League final that year, where they were defeated by Real Madrid after their shock run in the tournament. Brdarić played 18 games in the UEFA Champions League in total, scoring once (in a 3–1 win over Juventus in the 2002 campaign).

Brdarić's time with Leverkusen though began to wilt soon into the 2002–03 season, which even saw him playing for their amateurs in the Regionalliga North. The following season he was loaned out to fellow Bundesliga team Hannover 96 and managed 12 goals, his best tally yet at the top level.

This attracted VfL Wolfsburg in July 2004, signing for him €1 million in a three-year deal. Although he matched the previous season's tally of 12, this was a much more frustrating season as he found himself often substituted or starting on the bench. These annoyances caused him to fall out with teammates and club officials. Team manager Thomas Strunz labelled Brdarić an "egotist" for putting his own issues before the team.

After this turbulent year, he was quickly sold onto Hannover 96, rejoining the team he had been loaned to on a permanent three-year deal. However, controversy had not fully escaped him as he irked coach Peter Neururer with an interview in which he stated: "As a striker, you have some sort of lust for scoring. That's why a 4–4 with four goals scored by yourself is more important than a win for the team". This led to Brdarić being dropped and subsequently given limited playing opportunities.

This awkward situation was solved though by Neururer's sacking in August 2006, which he welcomed by unleashing criticism at his former coach, branding him "mean and dishonest" in their relationship and claiming he lacked the substance behind his front to aid the club. His time at the club then was much less fractious under Dieter Hecking and he managed five goals in just 11 appearances in the 2006–07 season, where he was blighted by knee problems.
His injured knee forced him eventually to end his career as player.

International career
Brdarić has also represented his country, making his international debut for Germany on 27 March 2002 against the USA in Rostock. He featured in the 2004 UEFA European Championship, making a substitute appearance against Latvia in the group stage. He was also an unused squad member in the 2005 Confederations Cup. His only international goal came in a friendly win in Iran on 9 October 2004.

Coaching career
On 24 March 2009, Brdarić  was named as the new director of sport and later also as manager for 1. FC Union Solingen. He was fired on 17 August 2009. He was appointed manager of TSG Neustrelitz in 2013, and led the team to the 2013–14 Regionalliga Nordost title before losing in a promotion playoff against FSV Mainz 05 II. He then took over as manager of VfL Wolfsburg II.

In May 2017 he left KF Shkëndija.

Personal life
Brdarić's father hails from Zagreb and his mother hails from Novi Sad.

In 2003, he recorded a CD entitled "The Wild 13". The song (co-written by Coastland Records' Marco Heggen) mocks goalkeepers Oliver Kahn, Jens Lehmann and Frank Rost. The title stems from Brdarić's shirt number.

During his time at Fortuna Köln, he was nicknamed 'Bambi' because of his very skinny legs.

He is married to wife Antje and has two sons, Tim and Lance.

References

External links
 
 
 

1975 births
Living people
People from Nürtingen
Sportspeople from Stuttgart (region)
Association football forwards
German footballers
Germany international footballers
Germany under-21 international footballers
Germany B international footballers
Bundesliga players
2. Bundesliga players
German people of Croatian descent
German people of Serbian descent
VfB Stuttgart players
VfB Stuttgart II players
SC Fortuna Köln players
Fortuna Düsseldorf players
Bayer 04 Leverkusen players
Hannover 96 players
VfL Wolfsburg players
German football managers
1. FC Union Solingen managers
UEFA Euro 2004 players
2005 FIFA Confederations Cup players
VfL Kirchheim/Teck players
Footballers from Baden-Württemberg
FK Shkëndija managers
tennis Borussia Berlin managers
FC Rot-Weiß Erfurt managers
KF Vllaznia Shkodër managers
chennaiyin FC managers
German expatriate football managers
Expatriate football managers in North Macedonia
German expatriate sportspeople in North Macedonia
German expatriate sportspeople in Albania
Expatriate football managers in Albania
West German footballers
German expatriate sportspeople in India
Expatriate football managers in India